Agoncillo is a surname. Notable people with the surname include:

Felipe Agoncillo (1859–1941), Filipino lawyer representative to the negotiations in Paris that led to the Treaty of Paris which ended the Spanish–American War in 1898
Marcela Agoncillo (1860–1946), Filipina seamstress renowned as the Mother of the Philippine Flag
Ryan Agoncillo, Filipino Film and Television actor, model, singer, photographer, and TV host
Teodoro Agoncillo (1912–1985), 20th-century Filipino historian